Santalum ellipticum, commonly known as Iliahialoe (Hawaiian) or coastal sandalwood, is a species of flowering plant  in the mistletoe family, Santalaceae, that is endemic to the Hawaiian Islands. Like other members of the genus, S. ellipticum is a hemi-parasite, deriving some of its nutrients from the host plant by attaching to its roots.

Habitat and range
Iliahialoe inhabits dry forests, low shrublands, and lava plains throughout the archipelago, including the Northwestern Hawaiian Islands, but has been extirpated from Laysan and Kahoolawe. Although never recorded on Niihau, its historic presence on the island is almost certain.

Uses

Non-medicinal
The laau ala (heartwood) of iliahialoe contains valuable, aromatic essential oils.  Trees were harvested for export to China between 1791 and 1840, where the hard, yellowish-brown wood was made into carved objects, chests, and incense. The iliahialoe trade peaked from 1815 to 1826.  Native Hawaiians used the wood to make pola, the deck on a waa kaulua (double-hulled canoe).  Powdered laau ala was used as a perfume and added to kapa cloth.

Medicinal
Native Hawaiians combined leaves and bark of the iliahialoe with naio (Myoporum sandwicense) ashes to treat kepia o ke poo (dandruff) and liha o ka lauoho (head lice).  Iliahialoe shavings mixed with awa (Piper methysticum), nioi (Eugenia reinwardtiana), ahakea (Bobea spp.), and kauila (Alphitonia ponderosa) was used to treat sexually transmitted diseases.

References

ellipticum
Plants described in 1829
Trees of Hawaii
Endemic flora of Hawaii
Flora without expected TNC conservation status